Ayesha Faridi (born 8 February 1979) is an anchor for the Indian business news channel ET Now.

Career

Ayesha began her career in 2003 with BBC World Service as a Reporter where she reported and anchored BBC's weekly half-hr show BBC Extra. Formulated, conceptualized and executed scripts, editing and show structures for BBC.
She joined ET Now in  May 2010.

References

External links 

 
 
 

1979 births
Living people
Indian business and financial journalists
CNBC-TV18
Delhi University alumni
Indian women television journalists
Indian journalists